Mikhaylovka is a rural locality (a khutor) in Yezhovskoye Rural Settlement, Kikvidzensky District, Volgograd Oblast, Russia. The population was 382 as of 2010. There are 3 streets.

Geography 
Mikhaylovka is located in steppe, on Khopyorsko-Buzulukskaya plain, on the left bank of the Svinukha River, 52 km northeast of Preobrazhenskaya (the district's administrative centre) by road. Yezhovka is the nearest rural locality.

References 

Rural localities in Kikvidzensky District